Pseudosmermus grisescens is a species of beetle in the family Cerambycidae. It was described by Pic in 1934.

References

Agapanthiini
Beetles described in 1934